Operation Henderson Hill was a US Marine Corps operation that took place in Happy Valley southwest of Danang, lasting from 23 October to 6 December 1968.

Background
On 23 October Marine intelligence detected that the People’s Army of Vietnam (PAVN) 90th Regiment had moved into the Arizona Territory and the 5th Marine Regiment was ordered to the area to investigate.

Operation
After small arms fire prevented their landing at the primary landing zone the 2nd Battalion, 5th Marines were successfully landed by nightfall on 23 October without opposition. The 2nd and 3rd Battalion, 5th Marines searched the area without making contact with any PAVN but did discover a 24-page “Winter-Spring 1968-9 Campaign” strategy document. The operation was then expanded into the An Hoa and Go Noi Island (located approximately 25 km south of Danang to the west of Highway 1) sectors in November.

The 5th Marines surrounded the PAVN 1st Battalion, 36th Regiment at Chau Phong but the PAVN attempted to escape rather than fight.

On 1 November between 11:00 and 17:00, elements of the 5th Regiment engaged several small groups of PAVN 6 miles east northeast of An Hoa killing 15.

The same day Marines found a 5 ton rice cache 9 miles east northeast of An Hoa.

On 7 November at 06:45 12 PAVN were engaged 5mi northeast of An Hoa killing 8. Later that day another 12 PAVN were engaged 6mi northeast of An Hoa, 5 were killed. On 11 November a Marine recon team observed 47 PAVN 3 miles northwest of An Hoa and called in artillery fire on them killing 16. On 13 November a Chieu Hoi led Marines to a 57-ton rice cache.

On 18 November at 09:15 a Marine recon team observed 80 PAVN 2 miles northwest of An Hoa and called in artillery fire on them killing 20 and causing 5 secondary explosions. At 15:20 another recon team observed 75 PAVN 3 miles northwest of An Hoa and called in artillery fire on them killing 28 and causing 3 secondary explosions. On 19 November at 14:30 a Marine recon team observed 55 PAVN 2 miles west northwest of An Hoa and called in artillery fire on them killing 33. Approximately 2 hours later in the same area the recon team observed 35 PAVN and called in artillery fire on them killing 23. 

On 20 November at 14:00 a Marine recon team observed 30 PAVN 6 miles southeast of An Hoa and engaged them with small arms killing 11 and capturing 1 weapon before the PAVN withdrew. At 16:00 a Marine recon team observed 24 PAVN digging foxholes 2 miles west northwest of An Hoa and called in artillery fire on them killing 5 and causing 2 secondary explosions. At 17:50 in the same area the team observed 35 PAVN moving southeast and called in artillery fire on them killing 10.  On 21 November in two sighting by Marine recon teams 36 PAVN were seen 3-6 miles northwest of An Hoa and were engaged by artillery fire killing 11.  On 24 November a Marine recon team observed 60 PAVN/Viet Cong (VC) 3 miles north northwest of An Hoa and called in artillery fire on them killing 20.  On 29 November a Marine recon team observed 22 PAVN 3 miles north northwest of An Hoa and called in artillery fire on them killing 12. 

On 5 December at 18:30 a Marine recon team observed 10 PAVN 6 miles north of An Hoa and called in artillery fire on them killing 8. At 19:00 a Marine recon team observed 15 sampans carrying 26 VC 6 miles north of An Hoa and called in artillery fire on them sinking 4 sampans and killing 16 VC.

Aftermath
The operation concluded on 6 December. PAVN/VC losses were 700 killed and 94 captured and 41 individual and 5 crew-served weapons captured for Marine losses of 35 killed.

References

Conflicts in 1968
Henderson Hill
Battles and operations of the Vietnam War in 1968
United States Marine Corps in the Vietnam War
History of Quảng Nam province